The 1987 Pittsburgh Panthers football team represented the University of Pittsburgh as an independent during the 1987 NCAA Division I-A football season.

Schedule

Game summaries

Notre Dame

    
    
    
    
    
    
    
    

Craig Heyward 42 Rush, 132 Yds

Roster

Coaching staff

Team players drafted into the NFL

References

Pittsburgh
Pittsburgh Panthers football seasons
Pittsburgh Panthers football